Peace Sign is the seventeenth studio album by guitarist/vocalist Richie Kotzen. It was released in Japan on September 9, 2009 and October 19, 2009 elsewhere.

Track listing

Personnel
Richie Kotzen – all instruments
Dan Potruch – drums (on "Long Way from Home", "Best of Times", "Paying Dues" and "Peace Sign")
Dave Donnelly – mastering

References

2009 albums
Richie Kotzen albums